Just Tony is a 1922 American silent Western film directed by Lynn Reynolds and starring Tom Mix, Claire Adams and Frank Campeau. It is based on the novel Alcatraz by Max Brand. It portrays a wild mustang who slowly comes to trust the cowboy who attempts to tame him.

Cast
 Tom Mix as Jim Perris
 J.P. Lockney as Oliver Jordan
 Claire Adams as Marianne Jordan
 Frank Campeau as Lew Hervey
 Duke R. Lee as Manuel Cordova 
 Walt Robbins as Shorty
 Tony the Wonder Horse as Tony - A Wild Horse

References

Bibliography
 Connelly, Robert B. The Silents: Silent Feature Films, 1910-36, Volume 40, Issue 2. December Press, 1998.
 Munden, Kenneth White. The American Film Institute Catalog of Motion Pictures Produced in the United States, Part 1. University of California Press, 1997.
 Solomon, Aubrey. The Fox Film Corporation, 1915-1935: A History and Filmography. McFarland, 2011.

External links
 

1922 films
1922 Western (genre) films
1920s English-language films
American silent feature films
Silent American Western (genre) films
American black-and-white films
Fox Film films
Films directed by Lynn Reynolds
1920s American films